John Day "Jack" Gleason (July 14, 1854 – September 4, 1944) was a 19th-century professional baseball player who primarily played third base. His younger brother, Bill Gleason, also was a ballplayer.
 
Gleason appeared in one game for the St. Louis Brown Stockings of the National League in 1877, that team's last season. He then played in the American Association for the St. Louis Browns in 1882 and the beginning of 1883 and the Louisville Eclipse for the majority of 1883. From 1884–1885 Gleason played for the St. Louis Maroons during their only season in the Union Association and their first in the National League. He played his last season in 1886 for the Philadelphia Athletics back in the American Association. He later managed the San Francisco club in the Pacific Coast League in 1906, 1907 and 1909.

External links

1854 births
1944 deaths
Major League Baseball third basemen
St. Louis Brown Stockings players
St. Louis Brown Stockings (AA) players
St. Louis Browns (AA) players
Louisville Eclipse players
St. Louis Maroons players
Philadelphia Athletics (AA) players
Baseball players from St. Louis
Minor league baseball managers
Minneapolis Browns players
Dubuque Red Stockings players
19th-century baseball players
Burials at Calvary Cemetery (St. Louis)